The 1985-86 Division 1 season was the 48th since its establishment. Paris Saint-Germain became champions for the first time in their history with 56 points. During this season the "Boulogne Boys" and "Gavroche" emerged. They were groups of supporters located in the Kop of Boulogne a stand in the Parc des Princes. On 26 July 1985, Paris Saint-Germain took the top spot in the league for the first time in their history after defeating Toulouse 3-1. On 20 September, Les Parisiens recovered from a 2-0 score and claimed a 2-3 victory over Lens. A victory that proved the strength of the current championship leader. On 29 November, Paris recorded a goalless draw against Girondins de Bordeaux, setting a new record of 22 matches without defeat along the way (previously held by Saint-Étienne in the 1957-58 season). The capital club would eventually lose against Lille in the 20th matchday after recording a run of 27 matches without a single defeat. On 11 April 1986, Oumar Sène gave PSG the victory over AS Monaco in stoppage time. Thanks to the victory, the club captained by Luis Fernández was virtually champion of France, with four points ahead of the second and with a better goal difference. The club would become the first club from Paris to win the league since 1936. On 18 April, PSG lost 3-1 against Metz with a surprising ending that saw Paris goalkeeper Joël Bats abandon the pitch injured, leaving his place to Luis Fernández. On 25 April, Paris SG claimed their first league title after easily defeating Bastia 3-1 at the Parc des Princes. After the match, fireworks blazed in the sky celebrating the first championship of the club. On 28 April, the Mayor of Paris, Jacques Chirac, received the champion of France at the Paris City Hall.

Promotion and relegation

Teams promoted from 1984–85 Division 2
 Champions: Le Havre 
 Runners-up: Nice

Teams relegated to 1985–86 Division 2
 18th Place: Rouen
 19th Place: Tours
 20th Place: Paris

League table

Results

Relegation play-offs

|}

Top goalscorers

References

 Division 1 season 1985-1986 at pari-et-gagne.com

Ligue 1 seasons
France
1